There are 122 listed buildings (Swedish: byggnadsminne) in Jönköping County.

Aneby Municipality

Eksjö Municipality

Gislaved Municipality

Gnosjö Municipality

Habo Municipality
There are no listed buildings in Habo  Municipality.

Jönköping Municipality

Mullsjö Municipality

Nässjö Municipality

Sävsjö Municipality
There are no listed buildings in Sävsjö  Municipality.

Tranås Municipality

Vaggeryd Municipality

Vetlanda Municipality

Värnamo Municipality

External links

  Bebyggelseregistret

Listed buildings in Sweden